Youyu County, also known by its Chinese name Youyuxian, is a county under the administration of the prefecture-level city of Shuozhou, in the northwest of Shanxi Province, China. It borders Inner Mongolia to the north and west.

History
Shanwu, south of present-day Youyuxian, was the seat of Yanmen Commandery during the Qin and Western Han. The post moved to Yinguan southeast of present-day Shuozhou under the Eastern Han and further south to Daixian under the Kingdom of Wei.

Geography
The Great Wall demarcates the northwestern border with Inner Mongolia's Liangcheng and Horinger counties; within the province, Youyu borders Zuoyun County to the east, Shanyin County and Pinglu District to the south.

Climate
Youyu has a monsoon-influenced, humid continental climate (Köppen Dwb), with cold and very dry winters, and warm, humid summers. Due to the high elevation and dry climate, the diurnal temperature variation averages  annually.

References

Citations

Bibliography

www.xzqh.org 
Hymn of Youyu County Spirit - Cursive Script
 . 
 .

County-level divisions of Shanxi
Shuozhou